Frederick Gilmer Bonfils (December 21, 1860 – February 2, 1933) was an American publisher who made the Denver Post into one of the largest newspapers in the United States.

Career
Born in Troy, Missouri, he entered the United States Military Academy in 1878, but resigned in 1881 and went into land speculation in the Kansas, Oklahoma and Texas booms. He purchased the Post with Harry Heye Tammen in 1895. 

Bonfils had met Tammen at the Windsor Hotel in Denver, where Tammen was a bartender (and editor of the Great-Divide Weekly Newspaper, as well as a  worker in a curio store).

In December 1899 Tammen and Bonfils were shot in their Denver Post office by W.W. Anderson, an attorney representing "maneater" Alferd Packer after a Post article had accused Anderson of taking Packer's life savings as a retainer.  In the scuffle in the office Bonfils was shot twice and Tammen three times.  Anderson was tried three times but never convicted while Tammen and Bonfils were convicted for jury tampering in the third trial.

In 1900, both Bonfils and Tammen were horsewhipped and hospitalized by a lawyer who disliked their yellow journalism. Bonfils took $250,000 hush-money from Harry F. Sinclair in the Teapot Dome scandal. Bonfils and Tammen both justified their style of sensationalistic journalism (as well as crediting their success as newspapermen) with the quote "a dogfight on a Denver street is more important than a war in Europe."

In 1902, Bonfils and Tammen founded the Floto Dog & Pony Show.  The show was named after Otto Floto, the famous sports editor of the Denver Post, who was involved in the publicity work for the show.  In 1906, when bareback rider Willie Sells joined the show, it was renamed the Sells-Floto Circus.  Bonfils and Tammen owned the show until 1921, when it was one of a number of shows acquired by the American Circus Corporation.

In 1909 Bonfils and Tammen bought the Kansas City Post and owned it until selling it to Walter S. Dickey in 1922. J. Ogden Armour was a silent partner in the endeavor. The Post with its tabloid format, red headlines and yellow journalism was closely tied to the rise of the Tom Pendergast political machine in Kansas City. The Post was to fold shortly after the collapse of the machine.

Death
Bonfils died of encephalitis at his home in Denver, Colorado in 1933 and was interred in the Fairmount Mausoleum at Fairmount Cemetery, Denver. At the time of his death, he was pursuing a libel lawsuit against the Post'''s competitor, the Rocky Mountain News. The life stories of Bonfils and Tammen were immortalized by their former employee, noted writer Gene Fowler, in the book Timber Line: A Story of Bonfils and Tammen''.

References

External links

 
 Frederick Gilmer Bonfils photos via Library of Congress

1860 births
1933 deaths
The Denver Post people
People from Troy, Missouri
United States Military Academy alumni
Editors of Colorado newspapers
Abuse of the legal system